Jan Zakrzewski (born 21 December 1970 in Gubin, Poland) is a long-distance and steeplechase runner. He was an Olympian at the 2004 Summer Olympics in Athens, Greece where he competed in 3000 metre steeplechase. Zakrzewski won a national championship in 3000 metres steeplechase (1991, 2001, 2004), 10000 metres (2004) and in cross country running (1996). Currently member of Oleśniczanka Oleśnica team.

References
 

1970 births
Living people
Olympic athletes of Poland
Polish male long-distance runners
Polish male steeplechase runners
People from Gubin, Poland
Athletes (track and field) at the 2004 Summer Olympics
Sportspeople from Lubusz Voivodeship